The Canton Fair Complex, formerly known as Guangzhou International Convention and Exhibition Center, is located on Pazhou Island in the Guangzhou (Canton City) in the People's Republic of China.

Interwine is held here.

Transport
Canton Fair Complex is served by three Haizhu Tram stations, Canton Fair Complex West, Middle, and East, as well as the nearby Xingangdong station and Pazhou station on Guangzhou Metro Line 8.

See also
 Canton Fair
 List of tourist attractions in China

References

Buildings and structures in Guangzhou
Convention and exhibition centers in China
Tourist attractions in Guangzhou
Economy of Guangzhou